A scandal is a strong social reaction to a disgraceful or discreditable action, circumstance, etc.

Scandal may also refer to:

Arts, entertainment, and media
Scandal (comics), a DC Comics villain

Films 
Scandal (1917 film), an American film starring Constance Talmadge
Scandal (1929 film), an American drama film
Scandal (1950 film), called in Japanese Shubun
Scandal (1989 film), a British film about the Profumo affair
Scandal (2012 film), called in Vietnamese Bí Mật Thảm Đỏ
Le Scandale (1934 film), French film
The Scandal (1923 film), British film by Arthur Rooke
The Scandal (1943 film), Spanish film

Literature 
"Scandal" (short story), a 1919 short story by Willa Cather
Scandal (Shūsaku Endō novel), by Shusaku Endo
Scandal (Wilson novel), by A. N. Wilson
 Notes on a Scandal, a novel by Zoë Heller
Scandal: How "Gotcha" Politics Is Destroying America, a book by Lanny Davis

Music 
Scandal (Australian band), a 1970s Australian rock/pop band
Scandal (American band), a 1980s American rock/pop band
Scandal (Japanese band), a Japanese pop-rock group
Scandal (EP), a 1982 EP by the American band Scandal
Scandal (album), a 2006 album by Kangta & Vanness
"Scandal" (song), a song by Queen from their 1989 album The Miracle

Television 
Scandal (TV series), a 2012 American television series
Scandal! (TV series), a South African television soap opera
The Scandal (TV series), a 2013 South Korean television series

Other uses 
Scandal (theology), an act that leads someone else to sin
Scandals (gay bar), Portland, Oregon, U.S.
Sex scandal, or just scandal
Solar Wings Scandal, a British hang glider design
Speciated by cancer development animals, a hypothesis concerning the development of Myxosporea (and potentially other parasites) from transmissible cancers

See also
 Scandalous (disambiguation)